Orgest Gava (born 29 March 1990) is an Albanian professional footballer who plays as a midfielder for KF Tomori in the Kategoria e Parë.

Club career

Lushnja
In July 2017, Gava joined newly promoted Albanian Superliga side Lushnja by signing a one-year contract. In an interview, Gava said that he was happy to be part of Lushnja. He made his competitive debut for the team on 10 September in the opening matchday of championship against Vllaznia Shkodër, scoring an owngoal in the first half in an eventual 0–2 defeat at the neutral ground of Loni Papuçiu Stadium. One week later, Gava scored his maiden goal, the opener with a shot just inside the box, but Lushnja was defeated 3–1 by Flamurtari Vlorë. With Lushnja already relegated, in May 2018 Gava stated that he'll leave the club once his contract expire.

Honours
Elbasani
Albanian First Division: 2013–14

References

External links
Albanian Football Association profile

1990 births
Living people
Footballers from Elbasan
Albanian footballers
Albania under-21 international footballers
Albania youth international footballers
Association football midfielders
KF Elbasani players
KS Shkumbini Peqin players
KF Bylis Ballsh players
KS Lushnja players
KF Trepça'89 players
Kategoria Superiore players
Kategoria e Parë players
Football Superleague of Kosovo players
Albanian expatriate footballers
Expatriate footballers in Kosovo
Albanian expatriate sportspeople in Kosovo